The Portuguese Volleyball Cup is the men's volleyball cup in Portugal. It is played by teams of all Portuguese divisions, and is organized by the Portuguese Volleyball Federation. The current holders are S.L. Benfica, who have won a record 20 cups.

Winners

Titles by club

References

Portugal
Cup